Emma Plasschaert (born 1 November 1993) is a Belgian sailor. She is a two-time World Champion in the Laser Radial class (2018 and 2021). She ended fourth in that class at the 2020 Summer Olympics.

Career
Plasschaert is born in Ostend, the largest city at the Belgian coast. She started her career in the small Optimist class, and after five years switched to the Europe class. She then switched to the Laser Radial class in 2010, and became part of the team around Evi Van Acker, who would win the bronze medal the 2012 Olympics. Plasschaert got her first top ten finishes at the World Championships in 2013 and 2014.

In August 2018 she became world champion in the Laser Radial class, beating 2016 Olympic gold medalist Marit Bouwmeester. Three years later she won a second world title.

Awards
2011: Young Sailor of the Year award from Belgian Sailing
2013: Female Sailor of the Year award from Belgian Sailing
2018: Female Sailor of the Year award from Belgian Sailing
2019: Female Sailor of the Year award from Belgian Sailing

References

External links
 
 
 
 
 

1993 births
Living people
Belgian female sailors (sport)
Olympic sailors of Belgium
Sailors at the 2020 Summer Olympics – Laser Radial
21st-century Belgian women